Tokyo Toni's Finding Love ASAP! is a reality television dating game show series starring Tokyo Toni, the mother of Blac Chyna. It premiered on November 10, 2019, on Zeus Network.

Development
After a controversial appearance on The Real Blac Chyna, it was announced that Tokyo Toni would star in her own show on Zeus Network.

Series synopsis

Overview and casting
Tokyo Toni's Finding Love ASAP! is an unscripted dating show which chronicles Tokyo Toni's search for a man.

In addition to the show's fifteen contestants, Love & Hip Hop: Hollywoods Lyrica Garrett appears as Toni's friend and confidante, while Toni's daughter Blac Chyna makes guest appearances in two episodes.

Contestants

Call-out order

Color key
 Winner
 Runner-up
 3rd place
 Bottom 2
 Eliminated
 Quit

Episodes

References

External links
 

2010s American reality television series
2019 American television series debuts
English-language television shows
Television shows set in Los Angeles